The UN Mission to support the Hudaydah Agreement (UNMHA) is a civil observer mission initiated by the United Nations in Yemen. Beginning in January 2019, the mission consists of civic authorities personnel, military personnel, and the police. The headquarters of the UNMHA is at Al-Hudaydah, located on the west coast of Yemen. The UNMHA mandate is between the Yemeni government and the Houthi movement. Retired Major General Michael Beary, from Ireland, is the current leader of the UNMHA mission.

References 

United Nations Security Council mandates
Houthi insurgency in Yemen